The 1957 European Figure Skating Championships were held on February 14–16, 1957 in Vienna, Austria. Elite senior-level figure skaters from European ISU member nations competed for the title of European Champion in the disciplines of men's singles, ladies' singles, pair skating, and ice dancing.

Results

Men

Ladies

Pairs

Ice dancing

References

External links
 results

European Figure Skating Championships, 1957
European Figure Skating Championships, 1957
European Figure Skating Championships
International figure skating competitions hosted by Austria
Sports competitions in Vienna
1950s in Vienna
European Figure Skating Championships